The Not Your Kind of People Tour  is the fifth world concert tour cycle by American/Scottish alternative rock group Garbage. The tour launched May 2012 in Los Angeles, United States and included headline performances and festival appearances throughout North America, Europe and Asia. The tour also routed South America and several festivals in Australia during 2013.

The tour marks the first Garbage concerts since 2007; and the first tour since the Bleed Like Me tour was ended in October 2005. "Thinking about going back on the road is both thrilling and terrifying in equal measure", lead singer Shirley Manson stated in a press release for the launch of the album and tour; "…but we’ve always enjoyed a little pain mixed in with our pleasure." The band's touring line-up is augmented by the addition of Eric Avery on bass guitar. Tour rehearsals took place in Los Angeles throughout March.

A DVD/Blu-ray release of the Denver, Colorado show was released in May 2013, titled One Mile High... Live.

Tour itinerary
In late 2011, Garbage announced their return to touring upon the release of Not Your Kind of People. The tour kicked off in United States West Coast, running through a few mountain states and Texas and then route into Europe for headline shows in United Kingdom, France and Russia before returning to North America to perform shows on the East Coast and Canada. The tour then made its way back to Europe for Garbage to perform their own headline shows in Netherlands, Luxembourg and across the United Kingdom, and to appear on the bills of rock festivals across Europe. Further performances were scheduled in Canada and Japan. The late April concerts in Texas, Colorado and Utah were rescheduled due to personal problems of Duke Erikson.

Broadcast and recordings

According to the band, MTV Hive would livestream the concert from Webster Hall as part of its monthly Live in NYC series, making the full performance available for on-demand viewing the following week after the concert. "So excited that MTV is filming our first show in NYC for more than seven years. It's going to be a pretty special night for us", lead singer Shirley Manson tells The Hollywood Reporter. "The gig sold out in 5 minutes flat so we know its going to be full of hardcore fans who have been waiting on our new record with unbelievable patience and overwhelming enthusiasm."

Opening acts

Laura Escudé (select dates)
The Jezabels (select dates)
Screaming Females (select dates)
Saiko (Santiago)
Coockoo (Russia)
The Cubes (Bratislava)
Private Life (Australia) (http://www.privatelifeband.com)
Superbus (Europe)
Io ECHO (North America)
White Mystery (Richmond) (http://www.whitemysteryband.com)

Setlists

The tour set list omits less well known songs for festival appearances. Upon the commencement of the tour, Garbage performed "Temptation Waits", "The Trick Is to Keep Breathing" and "The World Is Not Enough" for the first time in a few tour cycles. Newly debuted tracks from Not Your Kind of People were "Automatic Systematic Habit", "Blood for Poppies", "Control", "Man on a Wire" and "Battle In Me". Songs introduced during the run include "Milk", "Cup of Coffee" and "You Look So Fine" returned to the set over the course of the tour, while Not Your Kind of People tracks "Big Bright World", "Not Your Kind of People", "The One", "Beloved Freak" and "I Hate Love" were debuted and performed in concert, while a cover of "Because the Night" was introduced in 2013.

During this tour, Shirley quoted lines from Fleetwood Mac's "Dreams" and Freedy Johnston's "This Perfect World" on the outro for "You Look So Fine", Donna Summer's "Love To Love You Baby" on the intro of "Stupid Girl", and Madonna's "Erotic" on the intro to "#1 Crush". In addition to interpolating from "Talk of the Town" by The Pretenders on "Special", Shirley also quoted lines from their cover of "I Go to Sleep".

A number of intro tape samples were used throughout the tour, including the band's own then-unreleased song "Time Will Destroy Everything" as the lead tape. The "tears in rain" monologue from Blade Runner preceded "Hammering In My Head".

Tour dates

Cancellations and rescheduled shows

Box office score data

Promotional performances

References

External links
 Garbage official website
 Garbage setlist archive 2012 setlists

2012 concert tours
2013 concert tours
Garbage (band) concert tours